National Route 343 is a national highway of Japan connecting Rikuzentakata, Iwate and Ōshū, Iwate in Japan, with a total length of 65.1 km (40.45 mi).

References

National highways in Japan
Roads in Iwate Prefecture